The International Leadership Institute (ILI) is a leadership institute in Addis Ababa, Ethiopia.

Programs
ILI offers undergraduate degrees, diplomas, certificates and other training programs to eligible students. It also runs a master's degree program in Organizational Leadership in Addis Ababa.

Partners
The institute's financial partners include the World Bank, Christian Relief & Development Association (CRDA), Leadership Center of Ghana (LCG), Hope Africa University, and International Leadership Association (ILA). Among its academic partners are the Azusa Pacific University in the United States and the University of Greenwich Business School in the United Kingdom.

Universities and colleges in Ethiopia
Education in Addis Ababa